Cochylidia subroseana, the dingy roseate conch, is a moth of the family Tortricidae. It was described by Adrian Hardy Haworth in 1811. It is found from most of Europe (except Ireland, the Benelux, Denmark, the Iberian Peninsula, Croatia and Ukraine) to China (Anhui, Hebei, Heilongjiang, Henan, Hunan, Jilin, Shanxi, Tianjin), Russia, Korea and Japan. It has also been recorded from North America.

Adults have been recorded on wing in June to August.

The larvae feed on Solidago species. They feed on the flowers of their host plant. The species overwinters in a cocoon.

Subspecies
Cochylidia subroseana subroseana
Cochylidia subroseana roseotincta Razowski, 1960 (China)

References

"Cochylidia subroseana (Haworth, 1811)". Insecta.pro.

Cochylini
Moths described in 1811
Moths of Asia
Moths of Europe
Taxa named by Adrian Hardy Haworth